Modi'in Illit (lit. "Upper Modi'in") is a Haredi Israeli settlement and city in the West Bank, situated midway between Jerusalem and Tel Aviv. Modi'in Illit was granted city status by the Israeli government in 2008. It is located six kilometres northeast of Modi'in-Maccabim-Re'ut and is often referred to as Kiryat Sefer (lit. "Book Town"), the name of its first neighborhood, established in 1994. It was built on the land of five Palestinian villages: Ni'lin, Kharbata, Saffa, Bil'in and Dir Qadis. Modi'in Illit encompasses the neighborhoods of Kiryat Sefer and Achuzat Brachfeld (Brachfeld Estates).

The international community considers Israeli settlements illegal under international law, but the Israeli government disputes this.

History
A place named Kiryat Sefer (also called Dvir) is mentioned several times in the Book of Joshua and in the Book of Judges. However, this place is situated south of Hebron, and the Israeli Governmental names committee rejected calling the town Kiryat Sefer as was proposed initially, electing the name Modi'in Illit.

According to ARIJ the settlement was built on the land confiscated from several Palestinian villages:

1818 dunams from Deir Qaddis,
891 dunams from Bil'in,
833 dunams from Kharbatha Bani Harith,
384 dunams from Ni'lin.

The barrier surrounding the city divides the nearby village of Bil'in from most of its olive groves and other agricultural land and is the subject of the documentary Five Broken Cameras. The homes in Kiryat Sefer were completed in 1994, and the local council of Modi'in Illit was given city status on March 7, 2008. In keeping with its name, which means "Book Town," most of Kiryat Sefer's streets are named after a landmark sefer (book) written by Gedolei Yisrael. These include: Chofetz Chaim, Noda BiYehuda, Meshech Chochma, Avnei Nezer and Sdei Chemed.

Geography and climate
Located in the foothills of the Judean Mountains 286 meters (938 feet) above sea level, Modi'in Illit has mild winters and hot, dry summers with temperatures averaging  during the day. Modi'in Illit's immediate neighbors are moshav Matityahu, Lapid, and Hashmonaim.

Archaeology
An archaeological site now known as Khirbet Badd ‘Isa was discovered during a salvage dig by the archaeology department of the Civil Administration in Modi'in Illit in 1994. First protested by the Haredi community, the excavations eventually revealed what is believed to have been a farming village from the Second Temple period with a synagogue in the center, a ritual bath, homes and large public and private buildings, a winepress, as well as a collection of 145 Roman coins from the first century CE. Khirbet Badd ‘Isa was designated "a heritage site for the Haredi public" in 2011, and the Israeli government contributed NIS 3 million to develop the site, with another NIS 1 million reportedly coming from the Civil Administration. According to Mod'in Illit's Mayor Yaakov Gutterman of the Degel HaTorah party, the site "will operate according to the doctrines of our forefathers, according to the Jewish historical sources presented by the Bible, the Gemara and ancient Jewish sages only [and] will be open only to the Haredi public, which will keep it a proper place for them to visit and connect to their Jewish roots, without the distortions and disruptions of other places, where there is fear of hearing false opinions."

Demographics

According to the Israel Central Bureau of Statistics (CBS), as of the end of 2009, the city had a total population of 46,200, making it the largest Israeli settlement in the West Bank. The city had an annual growth rate of 13.2 percent in 2009, due to new home construction and natural population growth. An estimated 80 percent of the population is under age 30, and in 2006 the city's median age stood at 10, the lowest of all Israeli municipalities.

Education
Modi'in Illit has 30 elementary schools and 20 secondary schools (seminaries and yeshivas). Achuzat Brachfeld (Brachfeld Estates) is home to the Mir Brachfeld branch of the famous Mir Yeshiva.

The city is home to many commercial enterprises. Because of its sizable English-speaking immigrant population, it has become a center for outsourcing by American companies. There are approximately 80 synagogues. A significant number of men study the Torah full-time.

Local government

Yaakov Gutterman of the Degel HaTorah party, a rabbi, is the town's mayor. The first head of council of Modi'in Illit was Yosef Schwinger, appointed by the Ministry of the Interior. Yaakov Gutterman replaced him in 2002, and has been reinstated twice when he ran for election uncontested.

The Chief Rabbi and head of Rabbinical Court of Modi'in Illit is Rabbi Meir Kessler.

Israeli–Palestinian conflict

Legal status of the settlement

The international community considers Israeli settlements to violate the Fourth Geneva Convention's prohibition on the transfer of an occupying power's civilian population into occupied territory and are as such illegal under customary international law. Israel disputes that the Fourth Geneva Convention applies to the Palestinian territories as they had not been legally held by a sovereign prior to Israel taking control of them. This view has been rejected by the International Court of Justice and the International Committee of the Red Cross.

Modi'in Illit was granted city status in 2008, by Aluf Gadi Shamni. The Israeli NGO B'Tselem appealed the decision to the Ministry of Interior. B'Tselem claimed that the upgrading of Modi'in Illit's status to that of a municipality was of concern because the land on which Mod'in Illit was built was declared state land through a manipulative application of Ottoman Law, resulting in the confiscation of lands belonging to neighbouring Palestinian villages. B'Tselem also stated that the upgraded status would lead to an increase of the settler population of Modi'in Illit, and thus the change in status would be illegal. For these reasons, B'Tselem expressed "vehement opposition" to the change of status. In connection with separate allegations that the city has allowed illegal construction to take place, the Israel Defense Forces told Israel's Interior Ministry in May 2008 that Modi'in Illit was "in a state of lawlessness."

Israel's West Bank Barrier passes just east of Modi'in Illit. The barrier's section in this area was built to separate the Modi'in bloc settlements of Mattityahu, Modi'in Illit and Hashmona'im from the Palestinian villages of Bil'in and others. The Israeli government believes that Modi'in Illit would remain within Israeli jurisdiction in a final-status agreement with the Palestinians.

Attack on residents 
On the morning of 29 December 2008, a Palestinian worker who had worked in the settlement of Modi'in Illit for more than a decade attacked four Jewish Israelis, leaving one victim seriously and three others lightly wounded. He first stabbed two people for whom he was carrying out renovations in a private home on Rehov Yehuda Hanassi, wounding them lightly, and then stabbed and seriously wounded his Israeli employer who was overseeing the work. After stabbing a fourth person at a different location, he was shot and seriously wounded by a settlement security official and Magen David Adom volunteer as he attempted to flee out of the settlement. Reportedly, the assailant had been very friendly with Israelis for years. According to an Israel Police spokesperson, the stabbing was a "spontaneous" act in response to the aerial offensive on the Gaza Strip Israel had started two days earlier.

See also
Aryeh Finkel
Yishai Schlissel

References

External links
Unsettled - In West Bank Settlements, Sign of Hope for a Deal - New York Times (July 2009)

Religious Israeli settlements
Cities in the West Bank
Populated places established in 1994
1994 establishments in Israel
Israeli settlements in the West Bank